CD200 (Cluster of Differentiation 200) is a human protein.

CD200 may also refer to:

 Honda CD200 RoadMaster, a motorcycle
 Continental CD-200, a four-cylinder, horizontally opposed aircraft diesel engine

See also
CD200R1
Cd200 receptor 1 like
CD20
CD20-like family